Ramakant Bhikaji Desai  (20 June 1939 in Bombay – 27 April 1998 in Mumbai) was an Indian cricketer who represented India in Test cricket as a fast bowler from 1959 to 1968.

Ramakant Desai was an Indian fast bowler, who stood 5 feet 4 inches tall, earning him the nickname "Tiny". He made his Test debut against West Indies in 1958–59 took 4/169 in 49 overs. He troubled the batsmen with bouncers, which was unusual for an Indian bowler at the time.

He toured England in 1959, West Indies in 1961–62 and Australia and New Zealand in 1967–68. Against Pakistan in 1960–61, he took 21 wickets in the series. At Bombay, he scored a quick 85 batting at No.10, an Indian record, and added a record 149 for the ninth wicket with Nana Joshi. His best bowling performance in Tests was 6 for 56 against New Zealand at Bombay in 1964–65. At Dunedin in 1967–68 his jaw was fractured by a ball from Dick Motz, despite which he added 57 runs for the last wicket with Bishen Bedi.

In his first year in the Ranji Trophy, he took 50 wickets in 7 matches at an average of 11.10. It is still a record for Bombay. It included a performance of 5 for 10 and 6 for 28 against Saurashtra. In the Ranji Trophy final in 1960–61 he took 7 for 46 and 4 for 74 in Bombay's victory over Rajasthan. Two years later, also against Rajasthan in the final, he scored his only first-class century, 107, in another victory. In his 11 years in the Bombay team (1958–59 to 1968–69), he never finished in a losing side. Desai announced his retirement at the prize distribution ceremony of the 1968–69 Ranji Trophy final. 

As the only bowler of pace in the Indian team, he was perennially overworked. When Desai retired from regular first-class cricket after the 1968–69 season, when still only 29 years old, P.N. Sundaresan wrote that he "bowled his heart out on the dead pitches in India ... A more judicious use of his talent both in the Ranji Trophy and other matches could have preserved him as a penetrating bowler for a longer period."

Desai was the chairman of selectors from 1996–97. He resigned the post a month before his death. He died four days after being admitted in a hospital in Mumbai from cardiac arrest.

References

 Obituary in Indian Cricket 1998
 Christopher Martin-Jenkins, The Complete Who's Who of Test Cricketers

External links
 Cricinfo Profile
 Cricketarchive Profile
 "Ramakant Desai – The tiny titan" at Cricinfo

Indian cricketers
India Test cricketers
Mumbai cricketers
1939 births
1998 deaths
Indian cricket administrators
India national cricket team selectors
Indian Universities cricketers
West Zone cricketers
Associated Cement Company cricketers
Cricketers from Mumbai